Yonese Hanine (born 20 February 1990) is an Italian footballer of Moroccan descent.

Career

Chievo
Hanine made his team debut on 31 May 2009, the last day of the 2008–09 Serie A season. In 2009–10 season, he played 2 Coppa Italia matches as starters and scored once. He also played once at Serie A on 6 December 2009, substituted Luca Rigoni in the 73rd minute.

In July 2010, he graduated from Primavera under-20 football team, and loaned to Serie B team F.C. Crotone. In July 2011 he was signed by Barletta.

Ascoli
On 28 June 2012, 2 days before the closure of financial year of both "AC ChievoVerona srl" and "Ascoli Calcio 1898 SpA", Hanine moved to Ascoli Piceno in co-ownership deal for €500,000 in 5-year contract, with youngster Lorenzo Marchionni moved to opposite direction for €580,000. In January 2013 he was loaned to Aprilia.

On 17 October 2014 Hanine was released by Ascoli.

References

External links
 Football.it Profile 
 
 Profile at Chievo  

Italian footballers
Serie A players
A.C. ChievoVerona players
F.C. Crotone players
A.S.D. Barletta 1922 players
Ascoli Calcio 1898 F.C. players
Association football midfielders
Italian people of Moroccan descent
Italian sportspeople of African descent
People from Castiglione delle Stiviere
1990 births
Living people
Sportspeople from the Province of Mantua
Footballers from Lombardy